Civita may refer to:

Places

Italy
Civita, Calabria, a comune in the Province of Cosenza, Calabria
Civita Castellana, a comune in the Province of Viterbo, Lazio
Civita d'Antino, a comune in the Province of L'Aquila, Abruzzo
Civita di Bagnoregio, a frazione in the Province of Viterbo, Lazio
Civita (Cascia), a frazione in the Province of Perugia, Umbria
Olbia, known as Civita in Middle Ages, town in Sardinia
Civitanova del Sannio, a comune in the Province of Isernia, Molise
Civitanova Marche, a town and comune in the Province of Macerata, Marche
Civitavecchia, a town and commune in the Province of Rome, Lazio
Cividate Camuno, a commune in the province of Brescia, Lombardy

Other uses
Civita (surname)
Civita (think tank), a Norwegian liberal think tank

See also
Civitas (disambiguation)
Civitella (disambiguation)